Purnomo is both a surname and a given name. Notable people with the name include:

surname
Adrianus Purnomo (born 2000), Indonesian football player
Mohamed Purnomo (1961–2019), Indonesian sprinter
Saptoyoga Purnomo (born 1998), Indonesian Paralympic sprinter.

given name
Purnomo Kasidi (1933–1996), Indonesian politician
Purnomo Yusgiantoro (born 1951), Indonesian politician